St. Walburg is a town in west-central Saskatchewan's prairie region on Saskatchewan Highway 26. St. Walburg is surrounded by the Rural Municipality of Frenchman Butte No. 501.

The community is named for the wife of the first postmaster, but also to honour Saint Walpurga, an 8th century English nun educated by the Benedictines, who was canonized for a life dedicated to evangelical work among the German people.

History
The town and surrounding area were originally settled by Germans between the 1910s and 1930s, with a few Polish, Ukrainian and French settlers arriving later.

The Canadian Northern Railway (CNoR) continued the extension of its northwest branch line from North Battleford, reaching St. Walburg in 1919. This caused a boom in the area, with many homesteaders arriving within months, now able to deliver their production to the grain elevators at St. Walburg. The branch had served Hamlin, Prince, Meota (1910 extension), Cavalier, Vawn, Edam, Mervin, Turtleford (1914 extension), Cleeves, Spruce Lake and St. Walburg, with a fork to Paradise Hill and Frenchman Butte. Later the rail line and the Saskatchewan Highway 26 ran beside each other from Prince to St. Walburg. The Canadian National Railway abandoned the entire branch line in 2005, when the remaining grain elevators closed. The line was officially abandoned in 2008.

Demographics 

Economy
The main industries are grain and cattle farming. The oil and natural gas industries have become increasingly important in the area.

Notable people
Count Berthold von Imhoff (1868–1939) an artist known for his religious murals and paintings homesteaded southwest of St. Walburg in 1914. In 1937 he was awarded a Knighthood in the Pontifical Order of St. Gregory the Great by Pope Pius XI. He is buried in the St. Walburg Cemetery next to his wife Matilda. The Imhoff Museum (the home, studio and farm of Imhoff) was designated a Saskatchewan Heritage Property in 1993.

A life size equestrian statue honouring Imhoff by St. Walburg artist Susan Velder is located in the village. 
 
Cal Nichols, former chairman of the Edmonton Oilers Hockey Club.

References

External links

Frenchman Butte No. 501, Saskatchewan
Towns in Saskatchewan
German-Canadian culture in Saskatchewan